Jura-Nord Vaudois District is a district in Vaud canton of Switzerland. Its capital is Yverdon-les-Bains.

Geography
Of this area,  or 47.6% is used for agricultural purposes, while  or 44.1% is forested.

Demographics

In  there were 605 live births to Swiss citizens and 195 births to non-Swiss citizens, and in same time span there were 608 deaths of Swiss citizens and 48 non-Swiss citizen deaths.  Ignoring immigration and emigration, the population of Swiss citizens decreased by 3 while the foreign population increased by 147.  There were 6 Swiss men and 11 Swiss women who immigrated back to Switzerland.  At the same time, there were 581 non-Swiss men and 505 non-Swiss women who immigrated from another country to Switzerland.  The total Swiss population change in 2008 (from all sources, including moves across municipal borders) was an increase of 833 and the non-Swiss population increased by 893 people.  This represents a population growth rate of 2.3%.

The age distribution, in Jura-Nord vaudois is; 8,554 children or 10.7% of the population are between 0 and 9 years old and 9,981 teenagers or 12.5% are between 10 and 19.  Of the adult population, 10,235 people or 12.8% of the population are between 20 and 29 years old.  10,835 people or 13.6% are between 30 and 39, 11,974 people or 15.0% are between 40 and 49, and 10,169 people or 12.7% are between 50 and 59.  The senior population distribution is 8,264 people or 10.4% of the population are between 60 and 69 years old, 5,568 people or 7.0% are between 70 and 79, there are 3,578 people or 4.5% who are 80 and 89, and there are 607 people or 0.8% who are 90 and older.

Politics
In the 2007 federal election the most popular party was the SVP which received 26.09% of the vote.  The next three most popular parties were the SP (25.49%), the FDP (12.85%) and the Green Party (12.11%).  In the federal election, a total of 20,765 votes were cast, and the voter turnout was 43.7%.

Mergers and name changes
 On 1 January 2008 the former municipalities of Mézery-près-Donneloye and Gossens merged into the municipality of Donneloye.
 On 1 September 2006, the Grandson district (District de Grandson), Orbe district (District d'Orbe), La Vallée district (District de la Vallée) and the Yverdon district (District d'Yverdon) were dissolved and merged into the newly created Jura-Nord Vaudois district.
 The municipalities of Bonvillars, Bullet, Champagne, Concise, Corcelles-près-Concise, Fiez, Fontaines-sur-Grandson, Fontanezier, Giez, Grandevent, Grandson, Mauborget, Mutrux, Novalles, Onnens, Provence, Romairon, Sainte-Croix, Vaugondry and Villars-Burquin came from the Grandson district (District de Grandson).
 The municipalities of L'Abergement, Agiez, Arnex-sur-Orbe, Ballaigues, Baulmes, Bavois, Bofflens, Bretonnières, Chavornay, Les Clées, Corcelles-sur-Chavornay, Croy, Juriens, Lignerolle, Montcherand, Orbe, La Praz, Premier, Rances, Romainmôtier-Envy, Sergey, Valeyres-sous-Rances, Vallorbe, Vaulion and Vuiteboeuf came from the Orbe district (District d'Orbe).
 The municipalities of L'Abbaye, Le Chenit and Le Lieu came from the La Vallée district (District de la Vallée).
 The municipalities of Belmont-sur-Yverdon, Bioley-Magnoux, Chamblon, Champvent, Chanéaz, Chavannes-le-Chêne, Chêne-Pâquier, Cheseaux-Noréaz, Cronay, Cuarny, Démoret, Donneloye, Épendes and Essert-Pittet came from the Yverdon district (District d'Yverdon).
 The municipalities of Fontanezier, Romairon, Vaugondry and Villars-Burquin merged on 1 July 2011 into the new municipality of Tévenon.
 The municipalities of Essert-sous-Champvent and Villars-sous-Champvent merged on 1 January 2012 into Champvent and Prahins merged into Donneloye.
 The municipalities of Chapelle-sur-Moudon, Correvon, Denezy, Martherenges, Neyruz-sur-Moudon, Peyres-Possens, Saint-Cierges and Thierrens (all in the Gros-de-Vaud District) merged with Chanéaz on 1 January 2013 to form the new municipality of Montanaire, also in Gros-de-Vaud District.
In 2017 the former municipalities of Corcelles-sur-Chavornay and Essert-Pittet merged into the municipality of Chavornay.

Communes

References

Districts of the canton of Vaud